"Let the World Be Ours Tonight" is a song recorded and written by Canadian singer Deborah Cox. Released as a single on June 30, 2017, the track became her 13th number one hit on Billboard's Dance Club Songs chart in its September 16, 2017 issue.

Track listings

Charts

Weekly charts

Year-end charts

See also
List of number-one dance singles of 2017 (U.S.)

References

External links
Track listing at iTunes
Official video at YouTube

2017 songs
2017 singles
Dance-pop songs
House music songs
Deborah Cox songs
Songs written by Deborah Cox